Pleurophascum is a genus of haplolepideous mosses (Dicranidae) in the monotypic family Pleurophascaceae in the order Pottiales.

Species

Three species are recognised:

Pleurophascum grandiglobum 
Pleurophascum occidentale 
Pleurophascum ovalifolium

References

Moss genera
Pottiales